Kusakawa (written: 草川 lit. "grass river") is a Japanese surname. Notable people with the surname include:

, Japanese animation director
, Japanese manga artist

Japanese-language surnames